Kids Zone is a Pakistani cartoon channel. It is the first Pakistani cartoon channel to dub cartoons in Urdu. The channel has also recently started to dub anime  in Urdu. The channel is available on Apstar 7.

Kids Zone Pakistan is owned and operated by Mediacon Network Pvt. Ltd.

History 
In December 2018, Kids Zone was officially launched. The channel started to dub cartoons in Urdu which is the main reason the channel is popular. It also used to show some cartoons in English.

The channel is well known for airing Robin Hood, Leo and Tig, Slugterra, World Of Winx, Winx Club, Turning Mecard, and Miraculous: Tales Of Ladybug & Cat Noir In Urdu.

Programming

Currently series 
 Robin Hood
 Harris And Friends
 Leo and Tig
 Lanfeust Quest
 Apollo's Tall Tales
 The Lost Prince
 Treasure Island
 Iron Man: Armored Adventures
 Heroes Of Envell
 The New Adventures Of Peter Pan
 Sunny Bunnies
 Peppa Pig
 Chaplin
 The Jungle Book
 Turning Mecard
 Miraculous: Tales of Ladybug & Cat Noir
 Fantasy Patrol
 Bakugan Battle Brawlers
 World of Winx
 Zak Storm
 Seven and Me
 "Denver The Last Dinosaur"

Anime
One punch man

Hunter × Hunter (2011 TV series)(Coming Soon)

References 

Children's television channels in Pakistan
2018 establishments in Pakistan
Urdu-language television stations in Pakistan